Kenny Simpkins  (21 December 1943 - 16 February 2023) was a Welsh goalkeeper who played professionally in the 1960s.

Playing career
After five unproductive years at Wrexham he joined Hartlepool  during which time he played for the Welsh Under 23 side. On 18 November 1967, due to numerous injuries in the Hartlepool team, Simpkins started a game for the club as a striker and scored in a 3-2 win against Port Vale. He made a total of 134 appearances in all competitions for Pools, during his time with club he was managed by Brian Clough and was also a part of the first ever Hartlepool side to win promotion.

In 1968, Simpkins signed for Boston United as the club's back-up goalkeeper. Like at Hartlepool, Simpkins was forced to play one game as a striker due to an injury crisis. As a result, he became a cult hero as he scored a hat-trick in 15 minutes in a 4-2 win against Goole Town.

Personal life
After divorcing his first wife Hazel, he married a girl from Hartlepool called Marion. The couple had one daughter, named Julie. After his playing career finished, he lived in the town for many years with his wife before he moved to a care home in Blackhall Colliery later in life.

Simpkins passed away on 1 March 2023. His former Hartlepool team mate John McGovern paid tribute to him saying "He was a huge character in the dressing room during his four years at the club. He was always encouraging me in my early days at Pools and I am so grateful that through the years I thanked him for that guidance and help. Ken was a real winner and always gave everything for the team and he was loved by the promotion winning squad."

References

1943 births
2023 deaths
Welsh footballers
Footballers from Wrexham
Wrexham A.F.C. players
Hartlepool United F.C. players
Wales under-23 international footballers
Association football goalkeepers